Veltri is a surname. Notable people with the surname include:

Elio Veltri (born 1938), Italian journalist and politician
John Veltri (born 1938), American photographer
Rachel Veltri (born 1978), American actress and model
Richard D. Veltri (1936–2015), American engineer and politician